The Kupferschiefer (German for Copper Shale, also called Copper Slate) or Kupfermergel (Copper Marl), (T1 or Z1) is an extensive and remarkable sedimentary unit in Central Europe. The Kupferschiefer can be found in outcrop or in the subsurface straddling six countries, including parts of the southern North Sea. The lateral equivalent outcropping in England is called Marl Slate.

Despite its distinctive nature, the Kupferschiefer is not ranked as a formation but is officially declared a sub-unit of the Werra Formation, the lowest formation of the Zechstein Group, overlying the Rotliegend Group. The unit has been dated to 257.3 ± 1.6 Ma, placing it in the Wuchiapingian stage of the Late Permian.

The Kupferschiefer comprises black shales, bituminous marls, mudstones and limestones deposited mostly in an open marine setting, with the borders of its extension deposited in a shallow marine environment. At time of deposition, the area what is now northern Europe was covered by an enclosed sea; the Zechstein sea, characterized by anoxic conditions.

The Kupferschiefer is renowned for hosting one of the most important copper deposits in the world, which were mined at least since 1199 AD. Other mineral resources found in the unit include zinc, vanadium, lead and silver.

The Kupferschiefer is also an important lagerstätte; having provided fossils of early Archosauromorph reptiles, the ancestors to modern crocodiles and extinct dinosaurs, as well as pareiasaurs, many fossil fish, including Coelacanthus granulatus, Dorypterus hoffmanni and  Palaeoniscum freieslebeni, flora and other fossils. Famous finds from the unit include Parasaurus geinitzi, Protorosaurus speneri, Weigeltisaurus jaekeli and Glaurung schneideri.

Description 

The Kupferschiefer unconformably overlies various formations of the Rotliegend Group and the Varsican basement and forms the basal unit of the Zechstein Group. In some parts of the Zechstein Basin, the Kupferschiefer is underlain by the Mutterflöz Limestone, an organic-lean thin limestone unit. Despite its distinctive nature, the Kupferschiefer is not ranked as a formation but is officially declared a sub-unit of the Werra Formation, the lowest formation of the Zechstein Group. The Kupferschiefer is overlain by the Zechstein Limestone sub-unit of the Werra Formation.

The unit has been dated to 257.3 ± 1.6 Ma, placing it in the Wuchiapingian stage of the Late Permian. The age of the unit corresponds to the Ilinskoe part of the Sokolki Assemblage Zone of European Russia and the Tropidostoma Assemblage Zone of the Karoo Basin of South Africa.

The Kupferschiefer contains up to 30% organic matter, with variations across its extent. The basinal facies shows values of between 5 and 25% TOC, while the marginal facies present values up to 7% TOC and swell facies are much poorer in organic matter with values below 1%.

Basin history

Depositional environment 
The Kupferschiefer was deposited in a highstand setting, in a deep enclosed basin, covered by the Zechstein sea that was present on the paleocontinent Laurussia, the northern part of Pangea. The basin possibly had periodic connections to the Paleo-Tethys Ocean.

The climate of the Late Permian was extremely variable, with polar icecaps present near the south pole and hot and arid conditions prevailing in the tropic and paleotemperate regions of the northern and southern hemispheres. The Zechstein sea in the Late Permian was located at paleolatitudes around 15 to 16 degrees north. Large areas of Pangea were covered by deserts and arid conditions also prevailed near the Zechstein sea of the time.

Apatite oxygen isotope analysis has revealed that the Late Permian was characterized by a drastic increase in global temperatures, accompanied by a strong rise of eustatic sea level. The rise in oxygen isotope values was possibly related to an increase in volcanic activity. The Permian-Triassic extinction event, the biggest extinction event in geologic history, is thought to have been caused mostly by large volcanic provinces of the Siberian Traps.

Mining 

Prehistoric finds of slag and bronze from smelting sites on top of or immediately adjacent to outcropping Kupferschiefer ores at Wettelrode, Mohrungen, and Bottendorf in Central Germany evidence Early to Middle Bronze Age mining of the Kupferschiefer ores. The medieval mining history of the Kupferschiefer ores is documented in written sources since at least 1199 A.D. from the Mansfeld district in Central Germany. The Counts of Mansfeld developed several copper mines, smelters, and a mint at the town of Eisleben, where copper and silver coins were minted from the metals of the Kupferschiefer ores.

Germany 

The main mining district of the Kupferschiefer in Germany was Mansfeld Land, which operated from at least 1199 AD, and has provided 2,009,800 tonnes of copper and 11,111 tonnes of silver. The Mansfeld mining district was exhausted in 1990.

Eisleben in the Mansfeld Land is the type locality of two minerals; the nickel-arsenate maucherite, and betekhtinite, a copper-lead-iron sulfide. The latter mineral has a co-type locality in the Ernst-Thälmann shaft, that operated from 1906 to 1962 and produced 260,000 tons of copper; about 10% of the overall production from the Mansfeld area.

Many minerals have been found in the Sangerhausen district of Saxony-Anhalt, which produced 619,200 tonnes of copper and 3,102 tonnes of silver as of 2012, with 860,000; respectively 4,650 tonnes as remaining proven reserves.

In the Spremberg-Graustein-Schleife mining area, stretching across the Brandenburg district Spree-Neiße and Görlitz in Saxony, the Kupferschiefer is estimated to contain 130 million tonnes of ore, of which 1,486,000 tonnes of copper, with a copper content of 1.47%.

The Kupferschiefer contains up to 3% copper, 10 ppm of platina and up to 3000 ppm gold.

The "Im Lochborn" mine, mining from the Kupferschiefer, located in Bieber, Hessen is the type locality of the mineral bieberite, a cobalt sulfate named after the location. The mineral rösslerite, a magnesium arsenate, also has the mine as type locality.

Poland 
Two main Kupferschiefer mining areas in Poland are the North-Sudetic trough, with 212,894 tonnes of copper and 756.7 tonnes of silver mined as of 2012 and an estimated remaining reserves of 1,460,000 tonnes of copper, and the Fore-Sudetic monocline, with more than 20,000,000 tonnes of copper and more than 14,085 tonnes of silver mined since 1949. Main mining districts in Poland are the Głogów industrial district, the Lubichów and Grodziec fields, and the Konrad, Lena, Lubin, Nowy Kosciół, Polkowice, Rudna and Sieroszowice mines. The latter mine is the type locality for the silver-quicksilver amalgame, eugenite. The Polkowice mine is the type locality for two rare lead and germanium-bearing sulfide minerals; polkovicite, named after the mine, and morozeviczite.

Paleontological significance 
The Kupferschiefer has provided unique fossils of an early reptile; Protorosaurus speneri belonging to the Archosauromorpha, as well as Pareiasauria, fish, an insect and fossil flora.

As of 2014, at least 28 Protorosaurus speneri specimens are known from the Kupferschiefer in the states of Thuringia and Hesse in central Germany. The type locality for the species is Glücksbrunn, Heidelberg, near Schweina in Thuringia. The type locality for Parasaurus geinitzi is Walkenried in Lower Saxony. Fossils of both species were found containing quartz pebbles in their guts.

Fossil fish of the species  are abundantly found in different locations in the Kupferschiefer. Other fish found in the Kupferschiefer include Coelacanthus granulatus, Hopleacanthus richelsdorfensis, Acentrophorus glaphyurus, Menaspis armata, Muensterichthys buergeri, Platysomus striatus, and two species of Janassa and Wodnika.

Fossil content

Geologic maps 
Zechstein in blue

See also 

 List of fossiliferous stratigraphic units in Denmark
 List of fossiliferous stratigraphic units in Germany
 List of fossiliferous stratigraphic units in the Netherlands
 List of fossiliferous stratigraphic units in Poland
 Rio do Rasto Formation, contemporaneous fossiliferous formation of the Paraná Basin, Brazil
 Copperfields Mine of Canada
 Copper Country of Michigan
 Chuquicamata of Chile
 Copperbelt Province of Zambia
 Old Adaminaby and Lake Eucumbene of Australia

References

Bibliography 
Geology
 
 
 
 
 

Paleontology

External links 
  Images of Palaeoniscum freieslebeni from the Kupferschiefer
  Kupferschiefer.de

 
Geologic formations of Denmark
Geologic formations of Germany
Geologic formations of Lithuania
Geologic formations of the Netherlands
Geologic formations of Poland
Geologic formations of Russia
Shale formations
Mudstone formations
Marl formations
Limestone formations
Open marine deposits
Shallow marine deposits
Source rock formations
Fossiliferous stratigraphic units of Europe
Paleontology in Germany
Mining in Germany
Mining in Poland
Copper mines
Formations
Permian System of Europe